NRI Academy of Medical Sciences (also referred as  NRI Medical College) is the first medical academy in Andhra Pradesh, India started by NRIs. It is one of the medical colleges in Guntur District, offering graduate (Masters) and undergraduate (Bachelors) courses in medical sciences. It is located in Chinna Kakani which is part of Mangalagiri Tadepalle Municipal Corporation nearby cities are Guntur and Vijayawada. The academy is affiliated to the NTR University of Health Sciences Vijayawada.

Departments in the main campus
  
 Hospital: Over 1280 beds, with General Medicine, Orthopedics, Anesthesia, General Surgery, Ophthalmology, E.N.T, Pediatrics, Dermatology, OBG, Radiology, Medical Oncology, CMO, Physiotherapy, Dental, TB and CD, O.S.D.
 Specialized: Neurology, Nephrology, Psychiatry, Vascular Surgery.
 College: Anatomy, Physiology, Biochemistry, Pharmacology, Microbiology, Pathology, Comm. Medicine, Forensic Medicine, Physical Education.

Cardiovascular implant therapy
Cardiovascular device implant therapy is practiced at the NRI Heart Centre and Research Institute at the main campus.

Oncology
New building for Oncology and Radiotherapy opened west to main campus.

References
Illinois Society of Anaesthesiology
President of India visited the college on the Graduation day.

External links
NRIAS official Website

Medical colleges in Andhra Pradesh
Universities and colleges in Guntur district
Educational institutions established in 2000
2000 establishments in Andhra Pradesh